The 1972 Texas gubernatorial election was held on November 7, 1972, to elect the governor of Texas. Incumbent Democratic Governor Preston Smith was running for reelection, but was defeated in the Democratic primary by businessman Dolph Briscoe. Briscoe went on to win the election by a relatively small margin, winning 48% of the vote to Republican Henry Grover's 45%. Raza Unida candidate Ramsey Muniz won 6%.

The 1972 election marked the last time that a gubernatorial election was held concurrently with a presidential election and the last time that a governor was elected for a two-year term. Smith became one of five consecutive incumbent Texas governors to lose re-election.

Primaries

Republican

Democratic

Results

References 

1972
Texas
Gubernatorial